George Turnbull was a British engineer responsible from 1851 to 1863 for construction of the first railway line from Calcutta to Benares, some  – later extended to Delhi. Turnbull was acclaimed by the Indian government as the "first railway engineer of India".

Early life
George Turnbull was born in Luncarty, 5 miles north of Perth, Scotland in 1809, the 11th child of William Turnbull and Mary Sandeman – they moved in 1814 to nearby Huntingtower village, where his father developed a bleachfield. His two grandfathers Hector Turnbull and William Sandeman had jointly developed linen bleachfields in Luncarty. Initially largely schooled by his older sister Mary, George in 1819 from age 10 rode a pony to Perth Grammar School. In 1824 he attended Edinburgh University learning Latin, Greek and mathematics.

Career in England
In 1828 he sailed from Dundee to London to train under the famous civil engineer Thomas Telford building St Katharine Docks. In 1830 he became Telford's draughtsman and clerk, living in Telford's house in 24 Abingdon Street. He became an Associate of the Institution of Civil Engineers at age 19 and eventually the oldest member.

In 1832, he helped survey the options for supplying water to London both from the north and south, gauging the north-side rivers Colne, Gade, Lea, Odess and Ver; and on the south side the River Wandle. He was involved in 1833 with experiments for fast passenger canal boats on the Paddington Canal with Cubitt, Dundas and other prominent engineers.

In 1834 Telford died: Turnbull (Telford's clerk) made arrangements for his house and correspondence and was involved with his burial in Westminster Abbey.

Turnbull was promoted to be resident engineer building the Bute ship canal and Bute Dock (now West Bute dock) in Cardiff, reporting to William Cubitt and meeting Lord Bute regularly.

In August 1836 George was in Bristol to see the 1½-inch bar drawn across the river at Clifton for the future suspension bridge. Brunel visited him at the Cardiff works in 1839.

Amongst other journeys, Turnbull's January 1837 diary records travel from Cardiff to his parents' Perthshire home: the mail coach to Bristol (with no Severn Bridge or tunnel of course); all the next day Bristol to London "on Cooper's coach, sitting on the box seat outside with the coachman" (there was snow 10 feet deep near Marlborough); the steamer Perth for the 41-hour journey to Dundee; and then overland to Huntingtower, near Perth.

From 1840 to 1842 Turnbull built Middlesbrough Dock which was later bought by the Stockton and Darlington Railway. In 1841 he travelled through deep snow to Stirling to agree a contract to supply sleepers for the railway. In 1843 he was resident engineer for William Cubitt for the railway line from the Shakespeare Tunnel along the shore to Dover station (he entertained the Duke of Wellington, "pale, old and shaky on his legs", who visited the works) and built a pier and landing stages at Folkestone.

In 1845 he was the engineer in Birkenhead for the complex Seacombe Wall sea defence that helped drain the marshes behind the town of Seacombe.

In 1846-9 he was the resident engineer for the Great Northern Railway making cuttings and the South Mimms, Copenhagen and three other tunnels for the first 20 miles out of London, and making the first plans for King's Cross station.

East Indian Railway

In 1850 he was appointed Chief Engineer of the East Indian Railway building 1851–1862 the first railway  miles from Calcutta to Benares (on the route to Delhi),  including branches. He designed Calcutta's terminus at Howrah which now has 23 platforms and the highest train-handling capacity of any station in India. The monsoon-ravaged Ganges tributaries such as the wide Sone River were particularly challenging to bridge: a major constraint for Turnbull was the lack of both quality clay and brick-building skills resulting in the change to importing much ironwork from England for the many bridges and other structures (all rails were imported from England as no Indian steel works existed). Another constraint was the difficulty of moving enormous volumes of materials from Calcutta up the Ganges on its primitive "country boats", particularly during the period of the Indian Mutiny when many boats were sunk and materials stolen. Cholera killed thousands.

Offered a knighthood
Turnbull was offered a knighthood for his railway building in India, but declined it as he felt that he did not have sufficient money to live to the standard he felt was needed (he later regretted declining the knighthood, if only because it reduced his later earning power).

Calcutta drainage and sewerage
In 1856 the Bengal Government appointed Turnbull to be the Commissioner of Drainage and Sewerage.

Calcutta University Syndicate
In 1861 Turnbull was appointed a member of the Syndicate of the Calcutta University.

Sulkea Dock
In Calcutta in 1861 the Peninsular and Oriental Steam Navigation Company employed Turnbull to redesign the Sulkea Graving Dock, at Sulkea, and widen its entrance.

Great Indian Peninsular Railway
In February 1868, Turnbull was offered £2000 to settle the claim by contractors who had built part of the Great Indian Peninsular Railway. He travelled via Marseilles, Alexandria, train to Suez, and on to Bombay.

Personal life
In 1845 he married Jane Pope in St. Margaret's, Westminster. She died of fever on 23 August 1850 in Calcutta, only four months after arriving there. In 1855, after leave in England and on his way again to India, he married Fanny Thomas, the engineer William Cubitt's niece (in Neuchâtel, Switzerland because of concern that UK marriage to his deceased wife's half-sister might not be legal in England). Their first child [Ellen] Nelly was born on 14 July 1856 in Calcutta 9 months after their wedding. They had six children: their infants Jane and later Rose were born in Calcutta and successively buried in the same grave in Circular Road. Born in Calcutta on 17 March 1860 was their son George. Born in London were their son Alexander Duncan Turnbull on 10 March 1863 and daughter Katie on 4 June 1864.

The family retired to Cornwall Gardens in London and then in 1875 to Rosehill, Abbots Langley, Hertfordshire, England. The house Rosehill was built in the 1820s and demolished circa 1952. The house stood on Gallows Hill where the Gade View flats are today. He was the Vice-Chairman of the Assam Tea Company – his son (Alexander) Duncan Turnbull worked for the company in Assam and his granddaughter Doris was born there. George Turnbull's wife Fanny died in 1903.

Abbots Langley
Applying his engineering skills, Turnbull wrote the prospectus for the Abbots Langley Water Company and was much involved with the village's drainage and sewerage scheme in 1885. In March 1877, he also took a lease on 24 Collingham Place in London.

The village church includes a stained-glass memorial window with the inscription To the Glory of God in memory of George Turnbull C.E. born 1809 died 1889.  It was donated by his widow Fanny.

References

British canal engineers
British bridge engineers
British railway civil engineers
People of the Industrial Revolution
People from Perth and Kinross
Railway officers in British India
Scottish civil engineers
1809 births
1889 deaths
Alumni of the University of Edinburgh